Tribble or tribbles may refer to:

Entertainment 
 A tribble, a fictional creature in the Star Trek universe
 One of the Star Trek episodes involving tribbles:
 "The Trouble with Tribbles", their first appearance, in Star Trek: The Original Series
 "More Tribbles, More Troubles", in Star Trek: The Animated Series
 "Trials and Tribble-ations", in Star Trek: Deep Space Nine
 Tribbles (game), a card game based on the Star Trek creature

Science and technology 
 Tribble, a group of 12-bits (in early computing)
 Tribbles homolog 2, a protein kinase (type of enzyme) encoded in humans by the TRIB2 gene.
 Tribbles homolog 3, a putative protein kinase encoded in humans by the TRIB3 gene.
 A horizontal frame with wires stretched across it for drying paper. )

People 
 Tribble (surname)
 Tribble Reese, (born 1985), an American television personality, model, bartender and ex-college athlete
 Nancy Tribble Benda (1930-2015), an actress, educator, and a pioneer of educational television

Other uses 
 Tribble, West Virginia, an unincorporated community in Mason County
 Dr. Albert H. Tribble House, a historic house in Hot Springs, Arkansas
 Fraserwood/Tribble Ranch Field Aerodrome, an aerodrome 4.9 miles from Fraserwood, Manitoba, Canada

See also
 Trible (surname)
 Tribles Store, another name for Hazel Green, Kentucky